Nicole Buttigieg (born 4 August 1993) is a Maltese football forward.

See also
List of Malta women's international footballers

External links 
 

1993 births
Living people
Maltese women's footballers
Malta women's international footballers
Women's association football forwards